Disease resistance is the ability to prevent or reduce the presence of diseases in otherwise susceptible hosts. It can arise from genetic or environmental factors, such as incomplete penetrance. Disease tolerance is different as it is the ability of a host to limit the impact of disease on host health.

In crops this includes plant disease resistance and can follow a gene-for-gene relationship.

See also 
 Disease resistance in fruit and vegetables
 Disease resistance breeding

References 

Diseases and disorders